The Darling Family is a Canadian drama film, directed by Alan Zweig and released in 1994. Based on the theatrical play by Linda Griffiths, the film stars Griffiths and Alan Williams as a couple discussing the state of their relationship after the woman unexpectedly becomes pregnant, blending both scenes in which they talk to each other with scenes in which they verbalize their interior monologues.

Critical response
Geoff Pevere of The Globe and Mail reviewed the film favourably, rating it three stars and writing that "Although made on a minuscule budget and largely restricted to the unventilated spectacle of two people cautiously circling each other in closed spaces, The Darling Family never fails to resonate beyond its dramatic confines. Griffiths' script, which is every bit as critical of She as it is of He, captures precisely the paralyzing self-consciousness of contemporary gender relations, and does so with an economy that can shift from the comic to the tragic in the flick of a phrase: 'Oh no,' He panics at one point, 'she's happy.'"

Writing for Maclean's, Brian D. Johnson was more critical, asserting that "as an excursion into relationship hell, the film has an emotional veracity and psychological insight. But the spartan, deadlocked drama demands a lot of patience from the viewer. It is like one of those exhausting late-night discussions in bed that are destined to go nowhere."

References

External links
 

1994 films
Canadian drama films
English-language Canadian films
Films based on Canadian plays
Films directed by Alan Zweig
1990s English-language films
1990s Canadian films